Tonna Hospital is a psychiatric hospital in Tonna, Neath, Wales. It is managed by Swansea Bay University Health Board.

History
The hospital was officially opened as Neath District Isolation Hospital in March 1939. It joined the National Health Service as a children's hospital in 1948 and subsequently became a psychiatric hospital.

References

Psychiatric hospitals in Wales
Hospitals established in 1939
Hospital buildings completed in 1939
Hospitals in Neath Port Talbot
Swansea Bay University Health Board